Even Hammer (1 July 1732 – 22 February 1800) was a Norwegian civil servant. 

He was born in Ringsaker in Hedmark. He was the son of parish priest Ole Hannibalsen Hammer, who was vicar at Nes Church. In 1752, he became a student at the Christiania Cathedral School, where he later was a teacher from 1756 to 1768. He entered the  University of Copenhagen in 1752. He took his Magister degree in 1758. In 1768 he traveled abroad and studied at the universities of Oxford, Cambridge, Leiden, Göttingen and Paris. He served as County Governor of Romsdals amt from 1773 until his death in 1800. In 1777 he received the title of Court of Justice  (Justisråd) and in 1781 he was made Councillor of State (Etatsråd).

References

1732 births
1800 deaths
People from Ringsaker
People educated at Oslo Cathedral School
University of Copenhagen alumni
Norwegian educators
Norwegian civil servants
County governors of Norway